Andrew Lawrence Crofts (born 29 May 1984) is a former professional footballer who is currently a first team coach for Brighton & Hove Albion. He made 29 appearances for Wales at international level.

He started his career with Gillingham, for whom he made his Football League debut at the age of 16, and made over 190 appearances for the Kent-based club. He had loans at Peterborough United and Wrexham during the 2008–09 season and joined Brighton & Hove Albion in 2009. After a successful season at Brighton he transferred to Norwich City in 2010, before moving back to the South Coast club in 2012.

A tough-tackling midfielder, Crofts represented Wales, where one of his grandparents was born, at under-19 and under-21 level and won his first senior cap in 2005. In 2008, he won his 12th cap, breaking the record for the most international caps received by a Gillingham player.

He became the head coach for Brighton U23s in June 2021 after spending a year as a player-coach of the academy. In September 2022, Crofts was made the interim head coach of the first team after the departure of Graham Potter. After the appointment of the new head coach Roberto De Zerbi, Crofts stayed on the first team as a coach.

Early life
Crofts was born in Chatham, Kent, and began playing competitive football at the age of six for a club in nearby Rainham. Between the ages of 10 and 15 he attended weekly training sessions organised by Premier League club Chelsea. He also tried out on two occasions for the English Schools Football Association's national schoolboy team, but was unsuccessful.

Club career

Gillingham
In September 2000, Crofts joined Gillingham as a trainee and was a regular in the club's youth and reserve teams during the 2000–01 season. At the end of the season, shortly before his 17th birthday, he was a surprise inclusion in the first team squad for a match at home to Watford, and made his Football League debut as a late substitute, replacing Marlon King. The following season, he suffered a broken leg during a reserve team match and missed several months of the season. Although he returned to action in early 2002, his next appearance for the first team did not come until October, when he came on as a substitute in a League Cup match against Stockport County. This was to be his only senior appearance of the 2002–03 season. He finally secured a regular first team place towards the end of the following season, featuring regularly during March and April 2004.

Crofts was a first team regular in the 2004–05 season, making 27 Football League appearances, and scoring his first senior goal for the club in a defeat to Brighton & Hove Albion on 26 December. In January 2005, he signed a new contract designed to keep him at the club until 2009. He was omitted from the team for most of March and April, but was recalled for the last match of the season, in which a draw with Nottingham Forest led to the "Gills" being relegated from the Football League Championship, the second tier of English football, to Football League One, the third tier. In the 2005–06 season, he made the most appearances of any player in the Gillingham squad, missing only one of the team's 46 matches in League One. Although the team struggled in the league, finishing in the lower half of the table, they defeated Premier League team Portsmouth in the League Cup, with Crofts scoring the winning goal. The following season, he again made over 40 appearances and also scored eight goals, his best total for an individual season, but Gillingham again finished the season in the bottom half of the table. He made his 100th start for the club on 18 December 2006 in a match against AFC Bournemouth, and marked the occasion with a goal. At the end of the season, he won four awards at the club's Player of the Year event and was dubbed Mr Gillingham by then-manager Ronnie Jepson. He took over as team captain in the 2007–08 season, but it was an unsuccessful season for the team, who were relegated from League One. The following October he was stripped of the captaincy, which was instead given to Barry Fuller. Manager Mark Stimson stated that he felt that the captaincy might have been too much of a burden for Crofts, and had a negative effect on his form. Soon afterwards, the club made Crofts available for transfer.

Peterborough United and Wrexham (loans)
In November 2008, he joined Peterborough United on loan. Shortly after returning to Gillingham the following January, he went on a second loan period, this time to Wrexham until the end of the season. He made his debut on the same day in a 2–1 defeat to Burton Albion. Upon his return to Gillingham from his loan spell, he was released from his contract.

Brighton & Hove Albion
On 29 June 2009, Crofts agreed to join League One club Brighton & Hove Albion on a two-year contract. He made his debut for Brighton during the 1–0 home defeat to Walsall on 8 August 2009 and scored his first goal for Brighton during the 2–2 draw at Yeovil Town on 10 October 2009. Crofts was given the role of captain by new manager Gus Poyet before the 3–1 away victory at Southampton. Crofts was later confirmed as permanent captain at the beginning of January 2010.

Norwich City
On 21 May 2010, Norwich City announced the acquisition of Crofts from Brighton, for an undisclosed fee, believed to be in the region of £300,000. He became the club's first signing of the summer transfer window, signing a three-year deal at Carrow Road. On 6 August 2010, he scored a goal on his debut against Watford. He subsequently gained promotion to the Premier League with the "Canaries" in his first season at the club. He initially kept his place as a regular starter for Norwich in the top tier, but in the second half of the 2011–12 season he gradually fell out of favour at the club.

Return to Brighton & Hove Albion
Crofts was transferred back to Brighton for an undisclosed fee in August 2012.

Loan return to Gillingham
On 19 March 2016, Crofts re-joined Gillingham on loan until the end of the season.

Charlton Athletic
On 22 July 2016, Crofts signed a one-year contract with Charlton Athletic. He scored his first goal for Charlton in a 1–1 draw with Southend United on 31 December 2016.
On 1 September 2017 the club announced that he had ended his contract by mutual agreement.

Scunthorpe United
Crofts signed for Scunthorpe United on 31 August 2017, signing a one-year contract with the North Lincolnshire-based club. On 18 May 2018, he was not offered a new contract,

Newport County
On 26 June 2018 Crofts signed for Newport County on a one-year contract. He made his Newport debut in a 3–0 defeat at Mansfield Town on 4 August. Crofts was a 90th minute substitute for Newport in the League Two playoff final at Wembley Stadium on 25 May 2019. He was released by Newport at the end of the 2018–19 season.

Yeovil Town and second return to Brighton & Hove Albion
In June 2019 Crofts joined Yeovil Town as a player-coach. On 27 July 2019, however, he left the club to rejoin Brighton & Hove Albion as a player-coach with the club's under-23 side. He played for Brighton U21s in the 2–0 away win over AFC Wimbledon in the EFL Trophy on 3 September 2019.

International career
One of his grandparents were born in Wales so he was eligible to play in the Welsh national team, and after representing the country at under-19 and under-21 levels he won his first senior cap, in 2005. In 2008, he won his twelfth cap, breaking the record for the most international caps received by a Gillingham player. Crofts was selected for the Welsh national U-19 team in 2002. He made his debut team appearance in the Milk Cup tournament in Northern Ireland, but was forced to return home after suffering an ankle injury in the first match. In total he made eight appearances at under-19 level, including appearing in a second Milk Cup in 2003.

After moving up to the under-21 level Crofts was selected for the national U-21 team for the first time in a match against Germany in February 2005. He went on to gain 12 caps at this level, scoring one goal.

He made his debut in the Welsh national team against Azerbaijan on 12 October 2005, coming on as a substitute for Carl Fletcher. At the end of the 2005–06 season, as part of manager John Toshack's policy of introducing young players to the team, Crofts gained two further caps, both as a substitute, against Paraguay and Trinidad & Tobago, and also played in an unofficial international match against a Basque Country XI.

He was included in the starting line-up for an international for the first time in August 2007 when he played the full 90 minutes of a match against Bulgaria, but was back on the substitutes' bench for the UEFA Euro 2008 qualifying match against Germany the following month. He became established as a regular member of the Welsh squad during the UEFA Euro 2012 qualifying tournament.

Coaching career

Brighton & Hove Albion under-23's
On 5 June 2021, Crofts became the head coach of the Brighton academy after spending the previous season as a player-coach of the academy, thus ending his playing career.  His first professional match as a manager came on 14 September, in a 1–0 away loss to Walsall in the EFL Trophy group stage. Crofts earned his first competitive victory as a manager on 2 November, in a 2–1 away win at Northampton in the EFL Trophy.

On 8 September 2022, he was appointed interim head coach of the Brighton first team after the departure of Graham Potter.  After Roberto De Zerbi was appointed to replace Potter as manager, Crofts was appointed to the first team coaching staff.

Personal life
Crofts is a fan of Chelsea and at one time shared a flat with the club's future captain John Terry. During his time as captain of Gillingham, he was involved with a number of charity events, including acting as a celebrity waiter at a Gillingham pub and presenting a signed shirt to a brain damaged teenage fan. In January 2005, he dedicated a match-winning goal to his grandmother Lily, who had died several months earlier.

Career statistics

Club

International

Managerial statistics

Honours

Individual 

 Brighton Player of the Season: 2009–10
 Gillingham Player of the Season: 2006–07

References

External links

 at the Brighton & Hove Albion website
 at the Norwich City website

1984 births
Living people
Sportspeople from Chatham, Kent
Footballers from Kent
English footballers
Welsh footballers
Wales youth international footballers
Wales under-21 international footballers
Wales international footballers
Association football midfielders
Gillingham F.C. players
Peterborough United F.C. players
Wrexham A.F.C. players
Brighton & Hove Albion F.C. players
Norwich City F.C. players
Charlton Athletic F.C. players
Scunthorpe United F.C. players
Newport County A.F.C. players
Yeovil Town F.C. players
English Football League players
National League (English football) players
Premier League players
English people of Welsh descent
Association football coaches